Pretty Ricky' is an American R&B/hip hop group originating from Miami, Florida. The group originally consisted of brothers Diamond (Baby Blue) Smith and Spectacular Smith, plus Corey (Slick 'Em) Mathis and Marcus (Pleasure P) Cooper. Pleasure P was the group's main singer, while the other three members performed as rappers. After he departed in 2007 to embark on a solo career, the group shuffled through several replacement vocalists.

The name "Pretty Ricky" was taken from a character in the sitcom Martin. The group enjoyed its biggest success in the mid-2000s with their gold-selling albums Bluestars and Late Night Special, and the platinum singles "Grind With Me" and "On the Hotline".

Baby Blue, who appears on the show Love & Hip Hop: Miami, pleaded guilty to participating in a scheme to file at least 79 fraudulent loan applications seeking more than $24 million in forgivable PPP loans. Baby Blue used the loan proceeds to make "luxury purchases", including a Ferrari for $96,000.

 History 

 1997–2003: Beginnings 

In 1997, while performing together in Miami, Pretty Ricky was signed to Bluestar Entertainment by CEO Joseph "Blue" Smith. Supported by their father, Joseph Smith Sr., who also served as the band's manager and who is of Jamaican descent, the group developed their music under the name of "Pretty Rickie and The Maverix" before changing it to "Pretty Ricky". With the help from producer Jim Jonsin of the Unusual Suspects production team, Pretty Ricky began to gain desirable attention through their local performances. However, it was not until 2002 that the group encountered their initial success as their song "Flossin'" became a huge hit on Miami radio station Power 96.

 2004–2005: Bluestars 

In 2004, Pretty Ricky released their first official single, "Grind With Me". It reached #7 on the Billboard Hot 100, and was certified Platinum by the Recording Industry Association of America (RIAA).

The single made its way to popularity on WPOW-Power 96, and station program director Ira Wolf (Tony the Tiger) sent the single to Craig Kallman of Atlantic Records. After auditioning with Kallman, Pretty Ricky was offered a record deal on the spot.

On May 17, 2005, Pretty Ricky released their debut album titled Bluestars. It debuted at #16 on the Billboard 200 chart, selling 56,000 copies in the first week, and within several months, was certified Gold by RIAA. On June 15, 2005, Pretty Ricky released their second single from the album, "Your Body", which charted on the Billboard Hot 100 at #12.

In the summer of 2005 the group toured with Omarion, Bow Wow, Chris Brown, Bobby V, and other acts in the Scream Tour IV concert series.

 2006–2009: Late Night Special and Pleasure P's departure 

On November 9, 2006, Pretty Ricky released the first single off their second album, Late Night Special, titled "On the Hotline". It peaked on the Billboard Hot 100 at #97 and was certified platinum by the RIAA. In January 2007, Late Night Special topped the Billboard 200 album charts with over 132,000 copies sold in the first week. The second single from the album, "Push It Baby", featured Sean Paul but failed to crack the Hot 100, reaching only #109. Pleasure P later left the group after, and was replaced by Carl "Mowet" Lovett and soon after Christopher "4Play" Myers in 2007.

In 2008, Pretty Ricky began work on a new album, Eighties Babies, with an intended release date of October 14, 2008, but the album was shelved due to leaking and creative differences. 4Play quit the group in 2009 and was replaced by Emanuel "Lingerie" DeAnda. Pretty Ricky then split from Atlantic and signed with independent Atlanta label Big Cat Records, who released their official third album, Pretty Ricky, in November 2009. It charted for only one week on the Billboard 200, at #97.

 2010–present 

In 2010, Pretty Ricky released the singles "Personal Freak" and "Cookie Cutter", neither of which charted. On August 10, 2010, they released an extended play titled Topless. In December 2010, the group announced their fourth album, Bluestars 2, was in the works, but the album was never produced.

On August 12, 2011, Pretty Ricky released a mixtape titled Sex Music Vol. 1: Streets N The Sheets''.

After a three-year hiatus, Pretty Ricky released the non-charting single "Puddles" on February 16, 2015. This marked the return of Pleasure P.

In 2019, Pretty Ricky joined The Millennium Tour along with B2K, Mario, Chingy, Ying Yang Twins, Lloyd, and Bobby Valentino. On February 21, 2020, Pretty Ricky returned with a new single titled "Body", which is set to appear on the group's reunion album.

Discography

Studio albums

EPs

Mixtapes

Singles

References

External links 

American hip hop groups
American contemporary R&B musical groups
1997 establishments in Florida
Musical groups established in 1997
Musical groups disestablished in 2012
2012 disestablishments in the United States
Musical groups from Miami
African-American musical groups